4 Ruedas (4 Wheels) is a Mexican automotive enthusiast magazine created in September 1994.

Motor y Volante, published by Editorial Novaro, was the first Mexican car magazine with publication dating back to 1983. 4 Ruedas joined Car and Driver Mexico and Automóvil Panamericano in the mid-1990s. Despite not being the most successful 4 Ruedas was first published in a time when car marketing in Mexico was very poor, with only 17 car makers present in the country (now there are 41).

4 Ruedas is published monthly by editorial Grupo Notmusa. The headquarters is in Mexico City.

Content
The magazine has been divided into these sections since its creation:

 Mundo Sobre Ruedas (News)
 Pruebas (Tests)
 AutoNuevo (Prices of new cars)
 AutoUsado (Prices of used cars)
 AutoDeporte (Sport news)
 Sólo Una Más (Curious pictures)

Other sections were added later:

 AutoColección (Article about a special car and a double-face poster)
 AutoAccesorios (Car accessories page)
 FracciónDeSegundo (Article about a watch)

The magazine publishes every year the "Modelos ####" (e.g. Modelos 2007, published in October 2006). It is an article that shows the new car models that will arrive in Mexico within the next year.

Editorial
The only editorial director of this magazine has been Alejandro Guilbert P. since 1994; he now is director for the Mexican car magazine Cars México and YouTube Chanel Carsmexico TV.

References

External links
Official Website
Automotive Window Tinting
Does Cold Air Intake Increase MPG?

1994 establishments in Mexico
Automobile magazines
Magazines established in 1994
Mass media in Mexico City
Magazines published in Mexico
Monthly magazines published in Mexico
Spanish-language magazines